This is a list of chief justices of the Minnesota Supreme Court.

Minnesota Territory

State of Minnesota

Chief Justices of the Supreme Court
Minnesota law
Minnesota Supreme Court
Chief Justices